(born September 9, 1974) is a Japanese professional wrestler, primarily competing for Pro Wrestling Freedoms. Outside Freedoms, Kasai has worked for the original Pro Wrestling Zero-One, Hustle, Ice Ribbon, Combat Zone Wrestling (CZW) and Big Japan Pro Wrestling (BJW).

Professional wrestling career

In 1998, Kasai made his debut in a Big Japan Pro Wrestling (BJW) event in Osaka during the Deathmatch Wrestling boom of the late 90s. As BJW established a working relationship with American promotion Combat Zone Wrestling (CZW) at the turn of the millennium, Kasai joined the stable "CZW Warriors" (CZW Army) and feuded against the "BJW Warriors". Kasai formed the stable "Big Dealz" in 2001, with John Zandig, Nick Mondo, Wifebeater, Z-Barr and Trent Acid.

Since then Kasai has wrestled mainly for BJW and occasionally for other promotions such as Pro Wrestling Zero-One, K-Dojo and Apache Pro-Wrestling Army. Kasai's body is covered in scars, from all the hardcore wrestling he has done. This includes a Fans Bring the Weapons Match from the CZW show "Un F'n Believable", in which he took a bump onto a light tube board which ripped open his left elbow, exposing bone. In 2006 he won the first-ever IWA East Coast Masters of Pain after defeating Toby Klein, Mad Man Pondo and J. C. Bailey.

Kasai has participated five times in an extremely bloody "Razor Deathmatch"; a hardcore match where boards are fitted with many razor blades. The first of these deathmatches was held in 2005 with Jaki Numazawa, in which Jun took a powerbomb onto the razor bladed board. In the second one, held in 2008, Kasai's match was against the American wrestler Masada. On November 20, 2009, he defeated Ryuji Ito in another razor match after a double underhook facebuster on a cactus.

The fourth time was on April 5, 2010 where Kasai competed in a Barbwire Treaty Death Match that pitted Team CZW (Kasai, D. J. Hyde and Nick Gage) against Team BJW (Jaki Numazawa, Isami Kodaka and Masashi Takeda) in which a razor blade board was used in several bumps. On June 21, 2010 Kasai competed against the Necro Butcher in a Hardcore match for the Freedoms promotion; the razor blade board came into play mid way through the match.

In 2012, Kasai teamed regularly with American pro-wrestler/rapper One Man Kru. Together, they defeated the team of The Great Sasuke and Kesen Numajiro in a fluorescent light tubes death match at the September 9, 2012 Freedoms event in Iwate, Japan.

On January 3, 2021, Kasai defeated Yoshitatsu to win the All Japan Pro Wrestling's Gaora TV Championship.

Personal life
Kasai is married to his wife Michiyo; the couple have a daughter together. Kasai also has a son from a previous relationship.

He was born in Hokkaido and now lives in the mainland, but claims on his official website that he is from "Hiladelhia, America" as a joke; he has described Philadelphia as his second homeland. While Kasai wrestled in the United States, he was a lodger in Matthew Prince, better known as the wrestler Wifebeater's house. He has described Prince as a real madman, unlike many deathmatch wrestlers who are in fact gentlemen outside the ring.

Championships and accomplishments

 All Japan Pro Wrestling
 Gaora TV Championship (1 time)
Apache Pro-Wrestling Army
WEW World Tag Team Championship (2 times) – with Jaki Numazawa (1) and Tomoaki Honma (1)
Big Japan Pro Wrestling
WEW Hardcore Tag Team Championship (1 time) – with The W*NGer
BJW Tag Team Championship (3 times) – with Jaki Numazawa
Combat Zone Wrestling
CZW Ultraviolent Underground Championship (1 time)
CZW World Junior Heavyweight Championship (1 time)
CZW World Tag Team Championship (1 time) – with Men's Teioh
CZW Tournament of Death (2014)
DDT Pro-Wrestling
DDT Extreme Championship (1 time)
Dove Pro Wrestling
Dove Tag Team Championship (1 time) – with Gunso
 Japan Indie Awards
Best Bout Award (2009) vs. Ryuji Ito on November 20
Ice Ribbon
International Ribbon Tag Team Championship (1 time) – with Miyako Matsumoto
IWA East Coast
Masters of Pain (2006)
Pro Wrestling Freedoms
King of Freedom World Championship (5 times)
King of Freedom World Tag Team Championship (1 time) – with Masashi Takeda
Pro Wrestling Illustrated
Ranked No. 248 of the top 500 singles wrestlers in the PWI 500 in 2022
Tokyo Sports
Match of the Year Award (2009) vs. Ryuji Ito on November 20
Wrestle-1
UWA World Trios Championship (1 time) – with Nosawa Rongai and Shuji Kondo
Wrestle-1 Tag Team Championship (2 times) – with Manabu Soya

References

External links

 Jun Kasai at Cagematch.net
 Jun Kasai at Wrestlingzone.ru
 Jun Kasai's Blog (Japanese)

1974 births
20th-century professional wrestlers
21st-century professional wrestlers
Living people
People from Obihiro, Hokkaido
Japanese male professional wrestlers
Gaora TV Champions
UWA World Trios Champions
DDT Extreme Champions
Wrestle-1 Tag Team Champions
WEW Hardcore Tag Team Champions
WEW World Tag Team Champions
BJW Tag Team Champions
CZW Ultraviolent Underground Champions